The 1994 winners of the Torneo di Viareggio (in English, the Viareggio Tournament, officially the Viareggio Cup World Football Tournament Coppa Carnevale), the annual youth football tournament held in Viareggio, Tuscany, are listed below.

Format
The 24 teams are seeded in 6 groups. Each team from a group meets the others in a single tie. The winning club and runners-up from each group progress to the second round. In the second round teams are split up in two groups and meet in a single tie (with penalties after regular time). Winners progress to the final knockout stage, along with the best losing team from each group. The final round matches include 30 minutes extra time and penalties to be played if the draw between teams still holds. The semifinals winning teams play the final with extra time and repeat the match if the draw holds.

Participating teams
Italian teams

  Atalanta
  Bari
  Cagliari
  Cosenza
  Fiorentina
  Inter Milan
  Juventus
  Lazio
  Milan
  Monza
  Napoli
  Palermo
  Parma
  Reggiana
  Roma
  Sambenedettese
  Torino
  Verona

European teams
  Werder Bremen
American teams

  USA Soccer
  Pumas
  Flamengo

Asian teams

  Indonesia
  Yomiuri

Group stage

Group 1

Group 2

Group 3

Group 4

Group 5

Group 6

Second round

Knockout stage

Champions

Footnotes

External links
 Official Site (Italian)
 Results on RSSSF.com

1993
1994–95 in Italian football
1994–95 in German football
1994–95 in Mexican football
1994–95 in Indonesian football
1994 in Japanese football
1994 in Brazilian football
1994 in American soccer